Valentín Carderera y Solano (14 February 1796, Huesca - 25 March 1880, Madrid) was a Spanish painter, erudite scholar and collector. He was named honorary court painter during the reign of Isabel II.

Biography
In 1822, he won a grant to study in Rome, awarded by José António, Duke of Villahermosa. He remained in Italy until 1831, travelling widely and creating sketches and watercolours.

Back to Spain, in 1836, he received a commission to make an inventory of the nationalised works of art from suppressed monasteries in Castile. From 1838, he was a governing member of the board at the Museo Real de Pintura y Escultura. He was also a member of the Real Academia de Bellas Artes de San Fernando, where he taught art history and, from 1843, he held a chair at the Real Academia de la Historia.

His most familiar works are portraits of famous Spaniards throughout history; gathered together in a large anthology called Iconografía Española (1855, enlarged in 1864), which constitutes his magnum opus. In order to defray the costs of publication, he had to sell his collection of drawings and prints to the Biblioteca Nacional.

In 1866, he edited the first edition of the Discursos practicables del nobilísimo arte de la pintura, written in 1675 by Jusepe Martínez.

As a collector, he was particularly fond of the drawings and engravings of Francisco de Goya and owned a large collection of them. In 1835, he wrote the first substantial biography of Goya, which was published in  El Artista.

Writings 
Catálogo y descripción sumaria de retratos antiguos... coleccionados por D. Valentin Carderera y Solano, M. Tello, 1877.
Iconografía española : Colección de retratos, estaluas, mausoleos y demás monumentos inéditos de reyes, reinas, grandes capitanes, escritores, etc. desde el siglo XI hasta el XVII, copiados de los originales por... Valentin Carderera y Solano... con texto biográfico y descriptivo, en español y francés, in two volumes, R. Campuzano, 1855-1864.
Informe sobre los retratos de Cristobal Colon, su trage y escudo de armas. Leído á la real Academia de la historia, por su autor Don Valentin Carderera. Imprenta de la Real Academia de la Historia, 1851 Full text online @ Google Books.

References

External links 

More works by Carderera @ the Biblioteca Digital Hispánica

1796 births
1880 deaths
19th-century Spanish painters
19th-century Spanish male artists
Spanish male painters
Spanish portrait painters
Spanish art critics
Spanish art directors
People from Huesca